The Stead Primary Care Hospital was a NHS-run hospital located on Kirkleatham Street in the town of Redcar, England.

History
The hospital was opened as the "Stead Memorial Hospital", in memory of metallurgical doctor John Edward Stead, in Everdon house, his former home, in 1929. It operated for 81 years, becoming the town's main hospital until 2010, when it was then closed and left abandoned. It became a popular site for urban explorers prior to its demolition.

The Redcar Primary Care Hospital, constructed at a cost of £30 million, took on all its services and effectively replaced the Stead in 2010, and continues operating as the town's major care facility. There is a memorial to its predecessor in the main lobby.

References

Hospital buildings completed in 1929
Hospitals established in 1929
Buildings and structures in North Yorkshire
Hospitals in North Yorkshire
Defunct hospitals in England
Redcar